Mecynome aenescens is a species of beetle in the family Cerambycidae. It was described by Henry Walter Bates in 1885. It is known from Guatemala, Mexico and El Salvador.

References

Parmenini
Beetles described in 1885